Special Agent 7 is a 1958 American TV series starring Lloyd Nolan.

Premise
Special Agent Philip Conroy (Nolan) works for the Internal Revenue Service.

Cast
Lloyd Nolan as Philip Conroy

References

External links

List of episodes at CTVA

1958 American television series debuts
1959 American television series endings
1950s American crime television series
Black-and-white American television shows
English-language television shows
First-run syndicated television programs in the United States
Television series by Universal Television